The Bon Rencontre stadium is the second stadium of  Toulon behind the Mayol Stadium.  It seats 8,200 seated spectators and is currently used by the football club  Sporting Toulon Var.

The stadium of Bon Rencontre has three stands: stand Mouraille, stand Depallens and stand Borrelli.

Each stand hosts supporter groups: respectively the Indomitable Toulon 1993 at D block of the grandstand Mouraille, the TNT and the Association of Supporters at blocks D and C of the stand Depallens and Fedelissimi Toulon 1998 in the Borrelli stand. The stadium also has a parking lot for the opposing fans lying behind the goals (former South grandstand), which has no steps and is composed of clay.

The main achievements carried out between 2002 and 2005

The achievements made in 2002  
 Repair of floors of the western grandstand   
 Water supply works    
 Paintings    
 Depallens grandstand seats (1re slice)

The achievements made in 2003  
 Compliance of irrigation system    
 Paintings entrances, portals and other    
 Scoreboard   
 Depallens grandstand seats (2 slice)

The achievements made in 2004  
 North Stand Emergency control   
 Depallens grandstand seats (continued)    
 Demolition of the South Gallery + pylon    
 Installing new sound system    
 Paint work    
 Masonry work (fixing cracked walls)    
 Sealing work

The achievements made in 2005  
 VMC works (mechanical ventilation) in the locker room of players    
 Safety work, including portals    
 Visitors locker room work (1re slice)    
 Depallens stand seats in the grandstand (end)

The achievements made in 2008-2009  
 Borrelli grandstand seats, enlargement of the lower stairs    
 Grandstand seats for Mouraille stand   
 Construction of Depallens stand refreshment booth.

External links  
 Key achievements

SC Toulon
Football venues in France
Sport in Toulon
Buildings and structures in Toulon
Sports venues completed in 1955
1955 establishments in France
Sports venues in Var (department)